Doğan Holding is amongst the biggest conglomerates in Turkey operating in the energy, media, industry, trade, insurance and tourism industries. Founded by Aydın Doğan who still is a major shareholder, the company is led by his daughter Begümhan Doğan Faralyalı. Main operating activity of the Holding is to invest in various sectors via associates, to provide all necessary support to its subsidiaries and joint ventures in order to develop their activities.

Group companies

Electricity generation 
Galata Wind Energy
Aslancık HEPP (33%)
Boyabat HEPP (33%)

Petroleum products retail 
 Aytemiz Petrol (50%)

Industry & trade 

 Çelik Halat (BIST: CELHA): manufactures steel wires
 Ditaş Doğan (BIST: DITAS): manufactures automotive parts
 DDT / Dogan Trading: involved in trading of printing paper
 Sesa Ambalaj: manufactures packaging materials
 Kelkit Besi: involved in cattle ranching
 Neta Havacılık: involved in private aviation

Automotive & mobility groups 
Doğan Trend: Distributor and retailer of prominent cars, motorcycles, outboard marine engines & electrified mobility brands. The group also offers operational leasing, new & used car sales as well as servicing operations.

Brands represented by Dogan Trend as of 2022 November: 

- Cars: Suzuki, MG Motors, Suvmarket used car platform with SUV vertical focus 

- Motorcycles: Vespa, Piaggio, Aprilia, Moto Guzzi, KYMCO, Silence and Suzuki Motorcycles 

- Marin: Suzuki Outboards 

- Mobility: Wallbox Chargers, Bimas E-bikes

The company operates with more than 70 dealers & service points across country.

Finance & investment 
 DYBank / D-Investment Bank
 Doruk Finansman
 Doruk Factoring
 Öncü GSYO

Internet & entertainment 
 Radio Slowturk
 hepsiemlak.com
 KanalD Romania
 Doğan Publishing
 DMC / Doğan Music Company 
 Doğan Burda (joint venture with Hubert Burda Media)

Real estate Investment 
Trump Towers Istanbul
Milta Bodrum Marina
DoubleTree by Hilton Bodrum Marina Vista
Milpa (BIST: MIPAZ)

Media division sale 
On 22 March 2018, Doğan Holding announced to KAP of their intentions to sell their media division to Demirören Group. The sale has been criticized due to Demirören Group's close ties with the government. On April 5, 2018, the division was sold to Demirören group.

Lawsuits and accusations

POAS privatization controversy 
On Sept 3, 1998, the Petrol Ofisi (POAS) privatization tender ended with Akmaya-Orteks Group offering US$1.160 billion, Doğuş Holding-Garanti Bank USD 1.150 billion, Türkiye İş Bankası-Bayindir Holding-Park Holding-PUIS Grubu USD 1.110 billion.

The Privatization Board of Turkey however preferred Türkiye İş Bankası-Bayindir Holding-Park Holding-PUIS consortium. This was later on cancelled by the court and Dogan Holding won the next bidding process. The case involved serious corruption allegations, with then-Vice Prime Minister Mesut Yılmaz and then-State Minister Isin Celebi accused of abuse of power and Aydın Doğan of manipulating the public opinion through his media network.

Tax fraud charges 

On Sept 8, 2009, Dogan Yayin said tax authorities wanted companies it controls to pay a total of TL3.76bn ($2.5bn) in unpaid taxes and penalties – equivalent to more than four-fifths of the combined market value of Dogan Holding and Dogan Yayin. The fine was issued after an earlier tax penalty of more than $500 million was leveled against the group in February for tax irregularities connected to the sale of a 25 percent stake in its television unit to German publisher Axel Springer SE.

Three weeks later, Turkey's largest media group Dogan Yayin said it was officially notified of an increase in a tax fine to 4.8 billion lira ($3.22 billion). The Halkali Tax Office had sent notifications to Dogan Yayin, stating movable and immovable properties provided as a guarantee by the firm could be sold at the end of the legal process.

Some said that the tax fraud charges were an effort to censor criticism of Recep Tayyip Erdoğan.

Manipulation of tax court electronic distribution system 

Dogan's financial specialists and attorneys reclaimed their case file a number of times in order to ensure that it would not be put into the electronic distribution system in order to determine which court the case will be heard in. According to claims, Dogan's financial experts spent eight hours in the Tax Court on October 2, 2009 in order to ensure their case was handed over to a specific preferred court.

SPK accusations 
On September 28, 2009, Turkey's Capital Markets Board SPK, accused Aydın Doğan, Imre Barmanbek, Hanzade Doğan Boyner and Ali Riza Temuroglu for deliberately causing financial losses to Hurriyet Gazetecilik and Dogan Gazetecilik. It claimed that Dogan Holding purchased paper and publishing supplies at higher producer/seller unit prices from offshore companies—Sortal Trading Company Limited and Shawcliff Trading Limited—instead of direct producers. This, the SPK contends, cost Hurriyet Gazetecilik and Dogan Gazetecilik TL 33.12 million (US$22.19 million), excluding the interest. The SPK reported that it would take the case to court.

References

Conglomerate companies of Turkey
Companies listed on the Istanbul Stock Exchange
Companies based in Istanbul
Holding companies of Turkey
Holding companies established in 1980
Doğan Media Group
Turkish companies established in 1980